Scythris parnassiae is a moth of the family Scythrididae. It was described by Bengt Å. Bengtsson in 1997. It is found in Greece.

References

parnassiae
Moths described in 1997